Gunārs Meierovics (May 12, 1920–February 11, 2007) was a Latvian politician and the youngest son of the second Prime Minister of Latvia Zigfrīds Anna Meierovics. Meierovics was also a candidate for the 1993 Latvian presidential election.

Biography 
Meierovics was born on May 12, 1920, in Riga to Zigfrīds Anna Meierovics and his wife Anna Meierovics. He studied economics and engineering at the University of Latvia and Baltic University after becoming a war refugee. He was drafted into the Latvian Legion in World War II but emigrated to the United States after fleeing to Germany, where he worked at the United States Department of Defense. He was active in the American Latvian Association. In 1961, he was one of the main activists in the establishment of the United Baltic Committee in the United States. Meierovics also led the World Association of Free Latvians.

In 1993, he was elected to the fifth Saeima, and from the list of the political party Latvian Way, he was nominated as a candidate for president in the 1993 Latvian presidential election. Meirovics withdrew in support for the candidate Guntis Ulmanis. In the government of Valdis Birkavs, Meierovics held the position of the Minister of State of the Baltic and Nordic States at the Ministry of Foreign Affairs. In November 1995, Meierovics was awarded the Order of the Three Stars of the 3rd class. In 2001, Meierovics was awarded the PBLA Prize "for his extensive, long-lasting and successful work in strengthening the political position of the Baltics in the United States and Europe, in the struggle for the freedom of our nation and for the introduction of the new generation into Latvian central organizations."

Meierovics died on February 11, 2007, after battling Alzheimer's. Then-president Vaira Vīķe-Freiberga and Minister of Foreign Affairs Artis Pabriks expressed their condolences to his relatives.

References 

1920 births
2007 deaths
United States Department of Defense officials
Deputies of the Saeima
Latvian Way politicians
Latvian Farmers' Union politicians
Latvian people of Jewish descent